Sainte-Gemme-en-Sancerrois is a commune in the Cher department in central France.

Population

See also
Communes of the Cher department

References

Communes of Cher (department)
Cher communes articles needing translation from French Wikipedia